J band may refer to:
 J band (infrared), an atmospheric transmission window centred on 1.25 μm
 J band (JRC), radio frequency bands from 139.5 to 140.5 and 148 to 149 MHz
 J band (NATO), a radio frequency band from 10 to 20 GHz